Ebrahimabad (also Romanized as Ebrāhīmābād; also known as Kalāteh-ye Khān) is a village in Howmeh Rural District, in the Central District of Ferdows County, South Khorasan Province, Iran. At the 2006 census, its population was 62, in 19 families.

References 

Populated places in Ferdows County